Haunted Encounters (also known as Haunted Encounters: Face to Face) is an American paranormal television series that premiered on December 1, 2012, on the Biography Channel. The program features a paranormal investigation team, the Paranormal Syndicate, that investigates haunted hotspots that are the list of reportedly haunted locations and gather evidence to prove that it is haunted. Episodes aired at 10:00PM EST.

Cast and crew
Investigation team: Paranormal Syndicate
Daniel Hooven - Lead Investigator
Josh "Helmey" Kramer - Technical Specialist
Chelsea Damali - Psychic/Medium
Captain - K9 Investigator

Series overview

Episodes

Season 1 (2012)

See also
 Apparitional experience
 Ghost hunting
 List of ghost films
 List of reportedly haunted locations in the United States
 Parapsychology

References

External links
 of Haunted Encounters

The Biography Channel shows
Paranormal reality television series
2010s American documentary television series
2012 American television series debuts
2010s American reality television series
2012 American television series endings